Derow may refer to:
Peter Derow (1944-2006), American academic
Derow, Iran, a village in Ardabil Province, Iran
Derow, Bushehr, a village in Bushehr Province, Iran